Anton Kramar (born 5 February 1988) is a professional Ukrainian football retired midfielder.

Playing career
Kramar is the product of the Sportive School Olimp in Smila. His first coach was V. Nahornyi.

He signed a contract with FC Lviv and made his debut in the match against FC Feniks-Illichovets Kalinine on 17 July 2010, scoring one goal.

Singing career
After Kramar's contract with FC Cherkaskyi Dnipro expired in June 2018, he began to pursue his singing career and in December 2019 released his first single "Ми все розуміємо" (We understand everything).

References

External links
Profile at Official FFU site (Ukr)
 

1988 births
Living people
People from Smila
Ukrainian footballers
FC Dnipro Cherkasy players
FC Arsenal-Kyivshchyna Bila Tserkva players
FC Lviv players
FC Sevastopol players
FC Bukovyna Chernivtsi players
FC Desna Chernihiv players
FC Sevastopol-2 players
FC Hirnyk Kryvyi Rih players
FC Zirka Kropyvnytskyi players
Ukrainian Premier League players
Association football midfielders
Sportspeople from Cherkasy Oblast